is a Japanese manga series by Tōya Mikanagi which originally started serialization in the monthly Josei Manga magazine Monthly Comic Zero Sum published by Ichijinsha on August 28, 2007. There are currently twenty-eight volumes released in Japan. The series follows Nai and Gareki, who join a defense organization called Circus in hopes of finding a man named Karoku. However, they are unaware that Karoku belongs to a secret organization called Kafka, which is responsible for performing human and animal experiments called Varugas. A 13-episode anime adaptation by Manglobe aired between April and June 2013.

Plot
Nai searches for someone important to him, with only an abandoned bracelet as a clue. Gareki steals and pick-pockets to get by from day to day. The two meet in a strange mansion where they are set up, and soon become wanted criminals by military security operatives. When Nai and Gareki find themselves desperate in a hopeless predicament, they encounter none other than the country's most powerful defense organization, "Circus".

Characters

Main characters
 

 Nai is the main protagonist of the story. He claims to have always been living with a man named Karoku in a forest near Karasuna. When Karoku does not appear one day, Nai ventures outside and finds a trail of blood leading from their home to the sea, and a left-behind bracelet (Circus I.D.). Feeling scared and lonely, he sets out to try finding Karoku with only the abandoned bracelet as a clue. He eventually meets Gareki, who saves Nai from a mansion where a Varuga woman named Miné was keeping him captive. This marks the beginning of their travel together. Despite his unworldly ways, he has an acute sense of hearing that is more well-developed compared to other people's. Akari, a research doctor at Circus reveals that Nai has the cellular structure of a human and a "Niji", a small, delicate creature found in the forest he came from, and that these cells have managed to coexist unlike the Varuga. He also said that Nai is successfully existing as a new species and that if they were to describe the person who accomplished this, they would certainly be called a genius and that to produce a being like Nai, the creator must have been very devoted.

 A 15-year-old boy who gets money by robbing rich people's mansions. He is very intelligent and sharp, his strong point being his knowledge of mechanics. He is also a skilled shooter and likes to carry around a gun. Gareki distrusts people and is not very sociable, stating that he hates associating with others. However, despite his arrogant and distant attitude, he does have a more caring side that he does not like showing, seeming to have a soft spot for his friends on the second ship and Nai. He originally thought to use Nai for his robbing schemes but later joins him to find Karoku. When Nai tells Gareki about Karoku knowing that they were together, Gareki realizes that Karoku wants to keep him away from Nai. Gareki works with the Circus organization to help defeat Kafta and Varuga, who killed Tsubaki and Yokata.

Circus
Circus is a defense organization that works for the government. They perform raids to capture criminals and solve crimes that the Security Force otherwise cannot handle. After their raids, they put on shows as an apology for scaring the citizens.

 

The Second Ship's Fighter Yogi is an eccentric 21-year-old man who is always bright and cheerful. He is Hirato's subordinate. Despite his age, he tends to act like a child. He wears a white allergy patch on his left cheek, that, when removed, causes him to become extremely violent, as well as changing his hair color. While he states that battles make him nervous, he is still a skilled fighter. During the Circus's public shows he usually wears a cat costume named "Nyanperowna" and hands out candy to children. His weapons are two thorn-like épées, and the name of his special attack is Dornkiste (German for "thorn chest"). He calls Nai "little Nai". He looks after Gareki and Nai with Tsukumo. Though Yogi cares for everyone, he has a soft spot for Gareki.

Another fighter of the Second Ship's crew, and Hirato's subordinate. She is always wearing a serious expression on her face, is down to earth, and very dedicated. Tsukumo is a skilled acrobat and her beauty is complimented by both men and women. She is the most level-headed out of the group, and tries to be the shoulder to lean on even though she has a hard time understanding others emotions. Tsukumo is close to Nai, and cares about his well-being. She hated insects ever since she was a child, which was shown when Yogi mentioned that the species "Niji" has a diet of primarily insects.

The Second Ship's Captain. A very polite 27-year-old man who does not take his work too seriously, but does his job well. His smile can be deceiving and people have a hard time figuring out his true intentions and feelings. Upon taking Gareki and Nai on board his ship, he entrusts them to Yogi and Tsukumo. His weapon is a cane, and the name of his special attack is Vakuum (German for "vacuum").

The Second Ship's 25-year-old Lieutenant. She appears to be soft and feminine when she is with women but acts masculine when she is with men. She is very fond of Tsukumo.

A doctor working for the government. He is a complete workaholic; a fact which often grates on the nerves of the people around him. He does not seem to have a good relationship with Hirato, and Yogi seems to be slightly scared of him. It is implied that he is wealthy. Due to the reserved, unfeeling and stoic front, he puts up most of the time he is rather disliked by many, yet he is actually a very gentle person who cares for living beings, Nai being one of them.

A soft-spoken botanist who also First Ship's fighter. Jiki seems to have feelings for Tsukumo from the Second Ship and he does not get along very well with Eva.

The First Ship's Captain. An easygoing member of Circus who does not care about the small things. He often comes off as being quite rude, but he is simply being straightforward with his observations. He is the same age as Hirato.

The First Ship's fighter. A female member of Circus who is strong-willed, a sore loser and perfectionist. She considers Tsukumo her rival.

Akari's long-haired assistant, originally stationed in Life Division but occasionally help in Research Tower. He is very gentle and a bit of a klutz. His face is usually littered with band-aids. His family was killed by Varuga.

A white-bearded doctor working for the government, also known as the "Healer". He is very easygoing and happy-go-lucky despite his doctor status. He also likes to compliment girls and to act bubbly, like a kid. He does not take things seriously like Akari does, and enjoys prancing around laughing happily. However, when he sees Yogi, he sometimes throws him out of the room, quite literally.

Kafka
Kafka is a dark, hidden organization/place that does illegal genetic research. Their ultimate goal is to bring about the growth of incuna cells in human beings. They oppose the government and work against Circus.

 The person that Nai is looking for. He is 18 years old, and is described by Nai as a gentle person, but their connection is still unknown. He is still alive, but his location is unknown. At the end of the second episode of the anime, however, it is implied that Karoku is held somewhere by Kafka. He is seen in a dark greenhouse full of roses with Eliška, the young granddaughter of a rich industrial who is implied to be the leader of Kafka. He sends messages to Nai through brain waves. He calls Nai his "special child". During the incident at the Misty Mansion, it is revealed that there are two Karokus; one that appears to be Karoku but is not, and one that is the original Karoku. Gareki and Nai rescue the presumably dead original Karoku but Akari brings him back to life. When revived, he has no memories of who Nai is. After Nai protects him from dying, Karoku remembers Nai again.

 The 14-year-old granddaughter of Palnedo, the CEO of Gald. She grew up in an environment where she was treated like a princess, and as a result she was brought up to be a selfish girl who does not know how to be considerate towards others. She is revealed to have feelings for the fake Karoku. At one point when she hears Karoku say there is a special child in Circus, she believes him to be talking about Tsukumo, which makes her feel jealous. She seems to be unaware of Uro and her grandfather's true intentions and schemes.

 An associate related to Kafka whose powers are immense but yet to be revealed as of chapter 60 in the manga. Outwardly he acts as an escort and caretaker for Eliška and her grandfather, but controls and orders Varuga behind the scenes.

 The grandfather of Eliška and a rich CEO of Gald. He originally orchestrated the train hijacking to see how Circus would handle the situation. When Circus infiltrated the Misty Mansion, he discreetly escaped via submarine.

 Works under Uro with his partner Kiharu. He is a Varuga and is the brains opposite Kiharu. He, along with Kiharu, witnessed Yogi in his berserk form after his allergic patch was removed during a battle in the forest.

 Works under Uro with his partner Kagiri. He is a Varuga and is the nut opposite Kagiri. He, along with Kagiri, witnessed Yogi in his berserk form after his allergic patch was removed during a battle in the forest.

Varugas
Varugas are post-humans and post-animals with special abilities. They were once human or animal, but a cell-modifying medicine given to them by Kafka slowly took over their bodies until they were fully transformed, at which point they became monsters.

 A man with a claw-like right hand and red right eye when transformed. He experimented on Tsubame and Yotaka with different results and is the one responsible for killing Tsubaki.

 A wealthy woman who captured Nai, first seen in a mansion. Her arms can extend to extreme lengths. She was crushed under the rubble after a tussle with Gareki, and she died possibly by Uro.

 A man of large stature with two extra arms. He has an obsession for eyes. He attempted to attack Airship Two and capture Nai during their game of hide-and-seek, but failed in the end. He later returns to attack Circus during their infiltration into the Misty Mansion.

 A woman with long hair and caterpillar-like body. She has the ability to pass through the ground, who attempted to attack Airship Two and capture Nai during their game of hide-and-seek, but failed in the end. She later returns to attack Circus during their infiltration into the Misty Mansion.

Other characters

 The son of the president of the Lindain Group. He was protected by Nai, Gareki and Yogi after meeting them in a Nyanperowna shop.

 A young woman who saved and raised Gareki for some time. She was killed by Meiga.

 Tsubaki's younger sister and Yotaka's twin sister. She experienced psychosomatic results from Meiga's experiments.

 Tsubaki's younger brother and Tsubame's twin brother. He experienced physical results from Meiga's experiments.

 Hirato's older brother.

Media

Manga
On August 22, 2014, North American manga publisher Yen Press announced the license of the manga, with the first volume to be published on March 24, 2015. Yen Press is releasing Karneval volumes in a 2-in-1 omnibus format.

Volume list

Anime
An anime adaptation was announced in April 2012. The anime premiered on April 3, 2013, on ABC. It was later licensed for streaming by Funimation in North America and premiered on their streaming service April 8, 2013 at 12:35pm EST. The anime was released by Bandai Visual on Blu-ray and DVD volumes with English subtitles, with the first volume being released on May 28, 2013. Funimation later added the English dub version in June 2014, alongside Date A Live, Red Data Girl and Code:Breaker.

Episode list

Audio
A drama CD titled Karneval Circus was released on March 25, 2010, on the Frontier works label. An internet radio show premiered on January 25, 2013, on animate.tv, with Hiro Shimono, the voice of Nai as the host.

Reception

References

External links
Official anime website 

2013 anime television series debuts
Anime series based on manga
Bandai Visual
Fantasy anime and manga
Funimation
Ichijinsha manga
Josei manga
Manglobe
Theft in fiction
Yen Press titles